Robert Varkonyi (born 1961) is an American  poker player, best known for winning the Main Event of the 2002 World Series of Poker.

Early life
Varkonyi was born in and raised in NYC. He first started playing poker as an undergraduate at the Massachusetts Institute of Technology.

After his graduation in 1983 (with degrees in EECS and from the MIT Sloan School of Management), he was an investment banker in Brooklyn, New York for a number of years before beginning to play tournament poker.

Poker career
Varkonyi is most well known for winning the 2002 World Series of Poker Main Event, taking the $2 million prize.

In the WSOP Main Event the following year, Varkonyi was at the televised feature table, playing in defense of his championship. Two-time world champion Doyle Brunson was also featured at the table for a while. Later in the broadcast, 1998 world champion Scotty Nguyen was also at the feature table and they played several hands together. In the 2003 World Series of Poker, Varkonyi's chance of a repeat championship was dashed when his  met Nguyen's .

He cashed in the main event in 2007, finishing in 177th place in a field of over six thousand players, winning $51,398.

In the 2009 WSOP, Varkonyi competed with 19 other former WSOP main event world champions in the first ever Champions Invitational tournament. He finished the tournament in second place, being defeated in heads-up play by 1983 world champion Tom McEvoy.

At the 2011 WSOP, Varkonyi cashed in the Main Event for the third time in his poker career.  He finished in 514th place in a field of 6,865 players, earning $23,876.

As of 2011, Varkonyi's lifetime live tournament winnings exceed $2,200,000. His three cashes at the WSOP total $2,075,274.

World Series of Poker Bracelets

Personal life and family
Varkonyi currently resides in Long Island, New York, with his wife Olga, who also plays poker, and their daughters Victoria and Valerie.  Victoria was born a few months after the WSOP victory.

Olga made an appearance at the 2005 World Series of Poker main event, finishing in the money in 238th place.

References

External links
 Interview
 Hendon Mob tournament results

1961 births
Living people
World Series of Poker Main Event winners
World Series of Poker bracelet winners
American poker players
American gambling writers
American male non-fiction writers
MIT Sloan School of Management alumni
People from Great Neck, New York
American people of Hungarian descent